Fante, also known as Fanti, Fantse, or Mfantse, is one of the three principal members of the Akan dialect continuum, along with Asante and Akuapem, the latter two collectively known as Twi, with which it is mutually intelligible. It is principally spoken in the central and southern regions of Ghana as well as in settlements in other regions in western Ghana, Ivory Coast, as well as in Liberia, Gambia and Angola.

Fante is the common dialect of the Fante people, whose communities each have their own subdialects, such as Agona, Anomabo, Abura, and Gomoa, all of which are mutually intelligible. Schacter and Fromkin describe two main Fante dialect groups: Fante 1, which uses a syllable-final /w/ and thus distinguishes kaw ("dance") and ka ("bite"); and Fante 2, where these words are homophonous. A standardized form of Fante is taught in primary and secondary schools. Many Fantes are bilingual or bidialectal and most can speak Twi. 

Notable speakers include Cardinal Peter Appiah Turkson, Jane Naana Opoku-Agyemang, former United Nations Secretary General Kofi Annan, and former Ghanaian presidents Kwame Nkrumah and John Atta Mills.  Maya Angelou learned Fante as an adult during her stay in Ghana.

Today Fante is spoken by over 6 million people in Ghana primarily in the Central and Western Regions. It is also widely spoken in Tema, where majority of the people in that city are native Fante speakers who were settled after the new port was built. 

One striking characteristic of the Fante dialect is the level of English influence, including English loanwords and anglicized forms of native names, due both to British colonial influence and "to fill lexical and semantic gaps, for reasons of simplicity and also for prestige". Examples of such borrowings include rɛkɔso ("records"), rɔba "rubber", nɔma ("number"), kolapuse "collapse", and dɛkuleti "decorate". Native names are occasionally anglicized, such as "Mεnsa" becoming "Mensah" or "Atta" becoming "Arthur".

Etymology 
The name "Fante" has two possible etymologies, both in reference to the neighbouring Asante people. The first states that the Fante were named for their custom of eating spinach, or efan, while the Asante ate another herb called san; the second, that the Fante split from the Asante, receiving the name ofa-tew, "the half that separated". However, as well as being phonetically inconsistent, any connection these etymologies propose with the Asante is anachronistic: the Asante rose to power in the late 17th and early 18th centuries, and the Fante-Asante dichotomy only developed in the latter part of the 18th century, while the name "Fante" is much older. The true etymology is unknown.

Phonology

Consonants

Vowels 

Of these vowels, five may be nasalized: /ĩ/, /ɪ̃/, /ã/, /ũ/, and /ʊ̃/.

Fante exhibits vowel harmony, where all vowels in a word belong to one of the two sets /i e o u a/ or /ɪ ɛ ɔ ʊ a/.

Tones 
Fante, like all other varieties of Akan, has two contrastive tones, high tone (H) and low tone (L).

Orthography 
Fante has a relatively phonemic orthography. It uses the following letters to indicate the following phonemes:

Consonants 
Fante makes heavy use of digraphs, including ky (/tɕ/), gy (/dʑ/), hy (/ɕ/), tw (/tɕʷ/), dw (/dʑʷ/), hw (/ɕʷ/), and kw (/kʷ/). However, labialization is symbolized in other labialized consonants either with ⟨u⟩, e.g. pue (/pʷei/), bue (/bʷei/), tue (/tʷei/), hue (/hʷei/), huan (/hʷan/), guan (/gʷan/), nua (/nʷia/), and sua (/sʷia/); or with ⟨o⟩, e.g. soer (/sʷer/), soe (/sʷei/), and noa (/nʷia/). Furthermore, the digraphs ny and nw may represent /ɲ/ and /ɲʷ/, respectively, as in nya (/ɲa/) ("get"), and nwin (/ɲʷin/) ("leak"), parallelling the use of other digraphs in Fante; or they may represent two individual phonemes, /nj/ and /nw/ respectively, as in nwaba (/nwaba/) "snail".

Fante also uses the digraphs ts and dz, which represent /ts/ and /dz/ in Fante subdialects that distinguish the plosives /t/ and /d/ and the affricates /ts/ and /dz/, but are allophonic with t and d in those subdialects which do not distinguish them. Fante is the only dialect of Akan to distinguish /ts/ and /dz/ from /t/ and /d/, and is therefore the only dialect whose alphabet contains the letter ⟨z⟩.

Vowels 
Although ⟨e⟩ and ⟨o⟩ can represent multiple phonemes each, Fante orthography uses two strategies to distinguish them. First, Fante vowel harmony means /e/ and /ɪ/ are not likely to appear together in a word, nor are /o/ and /ʊ/. Second, if disambiguation is necessary, vowel digraphs may be used: ⟨ie⟩ to mean /e/ and ⟨uo⟩ to mean /o/. Thus /moko/ "pepper" is spelled muoko, while /mʊkʊ/ "I sit" is spelled muko.

Nasalization is marked with the diacritic ⟨  ̃⟩, but is only used when distinguishing "one of two or more words of the same spelling but different meanings which contain a nasal vowel", and is omitted when there is no danger of ambiguity. The diacritic may also be included on the wrong vowel, as in the word kẽka, where it is the second syllable that actually receives the nasalization.

References

External links

 Akan Language Home Page
 ISO 639 code sets

Akan language